The 1978 North Carolina Tar Heels baseball team represented University of North Carolina at Chapel Hill in the 1978 NCAA Division I baseball season. The Tar Heels played their home games at Boshamer Stadium. The team was coached by Mike Roberts in his 1st year as head coach at North Carolina.

The Tar Heels won the South Regional playoff to advance to the College World Series, where they were defeated by the Southern California Trojans.

Roster

Schedule

|-
! style="" | Regular Season
|-

|-
! bgcolor="#DDDDFF" width="3%" | #
! bgcolor="#DDDDFF" width="7%" | Date
! bgcolor="#DDDDFF" width="14%" | Opponent
! bgcolor="#DDDDFF" width="25%" | Site/Stadium
! bgcolor="#DDDDFF" width="5%" | Score
! bgcolor="#DDDDFF" width="5%" | Overall Record
! bgcolor="#DDDDFF" width="5%" | ACC Record
|- align="center" bgcolor="#ccffcc"
| 1 || February 24 || at  || Unknown • Florence, South Carolina || 8–2 || 1–0 || –
|- align="center" bgcolor="#ccffcc"
| 2 || February 25 || at Francis Marion || Unknown • Florence, South Carolina || 4–3 || 2–0 || –
|-

|-
! bgcolor="#DDDDFF" width="3%" | #
! bgcolor="#DDDDFF" width="7%" | Date
! bgcolor="#DDDDFF" width="14%" | Opponent
! bgcolor="#DDDDFF" width="25%" | Site/Stadium
! bgcolor="#DDDDFF" width="5%" | Score
! bgcolor="#DDDDFF" width="5%" | Overall Record
! bgcolor="#DDDDFF" width="5%" | ACC Record
|- align="center" bgcolor="#ccffcc"
| 3 || March 3 || at  || Unknown • Edinburg, Texas || 3–2 || 3–0 || –
|- align="center" bgcolor="#ccffcc"
| 4 || March 3 || at Texas–Pan American || Unknown • Edinburg, Texas || 5–0 || 4–0 || –
|- align="center" bgcolor="#ffcccc"
| 5 || March 5 || at Texas–Pan American || Unknown • Edinburg, Texas || 0–3 || 4–1 || –
|- align="center" bgcolor="#ccffcc"
| 6 || March 5 || at Texas–Pan American || Unknown • Edinburg, Texas || 7–6 || 5–1 || –
|- align="center" bgcolor="#ffcccc"
| 7 || March 6 || vs  || Unknown • Edinburg, Texas || 5–6 || 5–2 || –
|- align="center" bgcolor="#ccffcc"
| 8 || March 7 || at Texas–Pan American || Unknown • Edinburg, Texas || 3–1 || 6–2 || –
|- align="center" bgcolor="#ffcccc"
| 9 || March 8 || vs  || Unknown • Edinburg, Texas || 5–7 || 6–3 || –
|- align="center" bgcolor="#ccffcc"
| 10 || March 8 || at Texas–Pan American || Unknown • Edinburg, Texas || 7–3 || 7–3 || –
|- align="center" bgcolor="#ccffcc"
| 11 || March 9 || vs Northern Iowa || Unknown • Edinburg, Texas || 12–0 || 8–3 || –
|- align="center" bgcolor="#ccffcc"
| 12 || March 10 || vs Northern Iowa || Unknown • Edinburg, Texas || 6–3 || 9–3 || –
|- align="center" bgcolor="#ccffcc"
| 13 || March 11 || vs  || Unknown • Edinburg, Texas || 3–2 || 10–3 || –
|- align="center" bgcolor="#ffcccc"
| 14 || March 11 || at Texas–Pan American || Unknown • Edinburg, Texas || 3–4 || 10–4 || –
|- align="center" bgcolor="#ffcccc"
| 15 || March 13 ||  || Boshamer Stadium • Chapel Hill, North Carolina || 4–6 || 10–5 || –
|- align="center" bgcolor="#ccffcc"
| 16 || March 15 ||  || Boshamer Stadium • Chapel Hill, North Carolina || 5–3 || 11–5 || –
|- align="center" bgcolor="#ccffcc"
| 17 || March 15 ||  || Boshamer Stadium • Chapel Hill, North Carolina || 4–3 || 12–5 || –
|- align="center" bgcolor="#ccffcc"
| 18 || March 16 ||  || Boshamer Stadium • Chapel Hill, North Carolina || 7–0 || 13–5 || –
|- align="center" bgcolor="#ccffcc"
| 19 || March 17 ||  || Boshamer Stadium • Chapel Hill, North Carolina || 7–2 || 14–5 || –
|- align="center" bgcolor="#ccffcc"
| 20 || March 18 ||  || Boshamer Stadium • Chapel Hill, North Carolina || 2–0 || 15–5 || 1–0
|- align="center" bgcolor="#ccffcc"
| 21 || March 19 || at  || Sarge Frye Field • Columbia, South Carolina || 4–3 || 16–5 || 1–0
|- align="center" bgcolor="#ccffcc"
| 22 || March 20 || Madison || Boshamer Stadium • Chapel Hill, North Carolina || 5–1 || 17–5 || 1–0
|- align="center" bgcolor="#ffcccc"
| 23 || March 21 || at  || Malcolm U. Pitt Field • Richmond, Virginia || 3–5 || 17–6 || 1–0
|- align="center" bgcolor="#ccffcc"
| 24 || March 22 ||  || Boshamer Stadium • Chapel Hill, North Carolina || 6–3 || 18–6 || 1–0
|- align="center" bgcolor="#ccffcc"
| 25 || March 23 || at Duke || Jack Coombs Field • Durham, North Carolina || 19–3 || 19–6 || 2–0
|- align="center" bgcolor="#ccffcc"
| 26 || March 24 ||  || Boshamer Stadium • Chapel Hill, North Carolina || 6–1 || 20–6 || 3–0
|- align="center" bgcolor="#ccffcc"
| 27 || March 27 ||  || Boshamer Stadium • Chapel Hill, North Carolina || 4–2 || 21–6 || 3–0
|- align="center" bgcolor="#ffcccc"
| 28 || March 28 || St. John's || Boshamer Stadium • Chapel Hill, North Carolina || 5–13 || 21–7 || 3–0
|- align="center" bgcolor="#ccffcc"
| 29 || March 29 ||  || Boshamer Stadium • Chapel Hill, North Carolina || 16–5 || 22–7 || 3–0
|- align="center" bgcolor="#ffcccc"
| 30 || March 30 || Le Moyne || Boshamer Stadium • Chapel Hill, North Carolina || 7–9 || 22–8 || 3–0
|- align="center" bgcolor="#ccffcc"
| 31 || March 30 ||  || Boshamer Stadium • Chapel Hill, North Carolina || 8–1 || 23–8 || 3–0
|-

|-
! bgcolor="#DDDDFF" width="3%" | #
! bgcolor="#DDDDFF" width="7%" | Date
! bgcolor="#DDDDFF" width="14%" | Opponent
! bgcolor="#DDDDFF" width="25%" | Site/Stadium
! bgcolor="#DDDDFF" width="5%" | Score
! bgcolor="#DDDDFF" width="5%" | Overall Record
! bgcolor="#DDDDFF" width="5%" | ACC Record
|- align="center" bgcolor="#ccffcc"
| 32 || April 1 || at  || Shipley Field • College Park, Maryland || 5–3 || 24–8 || 4–0
|- align="center" bgcolor="#ccffcc"
| 33 || April 2 || at  || UVA Baseball Field • Charlottesville, Virginia || 12–11 || 25–8 || 5–0
|- align="center" bgcolor="#ffcccc"
| 34 || April 4 || at  || Riddick Stadium • Raleigh, North Carolina || 4–11 || 25–9 || 5–1
|- align="center" bgcolor="#ffcccc"
| 35 || April 5 || at East Carolina || Harrington Field • Greenville, North Carolina || 3–12 || 25–10 || 5–1
|- align="center" bgcolor="#ccffcc"
| 36 || April || at  || Ernie Shore Field • Winston-Salem, North Carolina || 6–0 || 26–10 || 6–1
|- align="center" bgcolor="#ffcccc"
| 37 || April 8 || Virginia || Boshamer Stadium • Chapel Hill, North Carolina || 4–8 || 26–11 || 6–2
|- align="center" bgcolor="#ffcccc"
| 38 || April 9 || Maryland || Boshamer Stadium • Chapel Hill, North Carolina || 3–5 || 26–12 || 6–3
|- align="center" bgcolor="#ccffcc"
| 39 || April 10 || at Liberty Baptist || Unknown • Lynchburg, Virginia || 8–2 || 27–12 || 6–3
|- align="center" bgcolor="#ccffcc"
| 40 || April 11 ||  || Boshamer Stadium • Chapel Hill, North Carolina || 6–5 || 28–12 || 6–3
|- align="center" bgcolor="#ccffcc"
| 41 || April 12 || Wake Forest || Boshamer Stadium • Chapel Hill, North Carolina || 6–5 || 29–12 || 7–3
|- align="center" bgcolor="#ffcccc"
| 42 || April 14 || South Carolina || Boshamer Stadium • Chapel Hill, North Carolina || 3–11 || 29–13 || 7–3
|- align="center" bgcolor="#ccffcc"
| 43 || April 15 || South Carolina || Boshamer Stadium • Chapel Hill, North Carolina || 4–0 || 30–13 || 7–3
|- align="center" bgcolor="#ccffcc"
| 44 || April 16 || NC State || Boshamer Stadium • Chapel Hill, North Carolina || 6–5 || 31–13 || 8–3
|- align="center" bgcolor="#ccffcc"
| 45 || April 17 || Clemson || Boshamer Stadium • Chapel Hill, North Carolina || 10–9 || 32–13 || 9–3
|-

|-
! style="" | Postseason
|-

|-
! bgcolor="#DDDDFF" width="3%" | #
! bgcolor="#DDDDFF" width="7%" | Date
! bgcolor="#DDDDFF" width="14%" | Opponent
! bgcolor="#DDDDFF" width="25%" | Site/Stadium
! bgcolor="#DDDDFF" width="5%" | Score
! bgcolor="#DDDDFF" width="5%" | Overall Record
! bgcolor="#DDDDFF" width="5%" | ACC Record
|- align="center" bgcolor="#ffcccc"
| 46 || April 20 || Duke || Beautiful Tiger Field • Clemson, South Carolina || 2–3 || 32–14 || 9–3
|-

|-
! bgcolor="#DDDDFF" width="3%" | #
! bgcolor="#DDDDFF" width="7%" | Date
! bgcolor="#DDDDFF" width="14%" | Opponent
! bgcolor="#DDDDFF" width="25%" | Site/Stadium
! bgcolor="#DDDDFF" width="5%" | Score
! bgcolor="#DDDDFF" width="5%" | Overall Record
! bgcolor="#DDDDFF" width="5%" | ACC Record
|- align="center" bgcolor="#ccffcc"
| 47 || April 28 || at  || Howard Johnson Field • Johnson City, Tennessee || 5–1 || 33–14 || 9–3
|-

|-
! bgcolor="#DDDDFF" width="3%" | #
! bgcolor="#DDDDFF" width="7%" | Date
! bgcolor="#DDDDFF" width="14%" | Opponent
! bgcolor="#DDDDFF" width="25%" | Site/Stadium
! bgcolor="#DDDDFF" width="5%" | Score
! bgcolor="#DDDDFF" width="5%" | Overall Record
! bgcolor="#DDDDFF" width="5%" | ACC Record
|- align="center" bgcolor="#ccffcc"
| 48 || May 20 || vs East Tennessee State || Plainsman Park • Auburn, Alabama || 15–1 || 34–14 || 9–3
|- align="center" bgcolor="#ccffcc"
| 49 || May 21 || at  || Plainsman Park • Auburn, Alabama || 3–2 || 35–14 || 9–3
|- align="center" bgcolor="#ffcccc"
| 50 || May 22 || vs  || Plainsman Park • Auburn, Alabama || 6–8 || 35–15 || 9–3
|- align="center" bgcolor="#ccffcc"
| 51 || May 23 || vs Memphis State || Plainsman Park • Auburn, Alabama || 11–9 || 36–15 || 9–3
|-

|-
! bgcolor="#DDDDFF" width="3%" | #
! bgcolor="#DDDDFF" width="7%" | Date
! bgcolor="#DDDDFF" width="14%" | Opponent
! bgcolor="#DDDDFF" width="25%" | Site/Stadium
! bgcolor="#DDDDFF" width="5%" | Score
! bgcolor="#DDDDFF" width="5%" | Overall Record
! bgcolor="#DDDDFF" width="5%" | ACC Record
|- align="center" bgcolor="#ffcccc"
| 52 || June 3 || vs  || Johnny Rosenblatt Stadium • Omaha, Nebraska || 0–11 || 36–16 || 9–3
|- align="center" bgcolor="#ccffcc"
| 53 || June 4 || vs St. Johns || Johnny Rosenblatt Stadium • Omaha, Nebraska || 9–5 || 37–16 || 9–3
|- align="center" bgcolor="#ccffcc"
| 54 || June 5 || vs Michigan || Johnny Rosenblatt Stadium • Omaha, Nebraska || 7–6 || 38–16 || 9–3
|- align="center" bgcolor="#ffcccc"
| 55 || June 6 || vs Southern California || Johnny Rosenblatt Stadium • Omaha, Nebraska || 2–3 || 38–17 || 9–3
|-

|-
|

Awards and honors
Jim Atkinson
First Team All-ACC

Greg Norris
First Team All-ACC
ACC Player of the Year

References

North Carolina Tar Heels baseball seasons
North Carolina Tar Heels baseball
College World Series seasons
North Carolina